Anthology of Anvil is a compilation album by Canadian heavy metal band Anvil.

Track listing

Personnel 
 Steve "Lips" Kudlow – vocals, guitar (all tracks)
 Ivan Hurd – guitar (tracks 2, 5, 10 & 17)
 Glenn Gyorffy – bass (tracks 5 & 10)
 Robb Reiner – drums (all tracks)
 Dave "Squirrely" Allison – guitar (tracks 1, 3, 4, 7, 8, 9, 11, 13, 14, 15, 16 & 18)
 Ian "Dix" Dickson – bass (tracks 1, 3, 4, 6, 7, 8, 9, 11, 13, 14, 15, 16 & 18)
 Sebastian Marino – guitar (track 6)
 Mike Duncan – bass (tracks 2 & 17)

References 

2000 compilation albums
Anvil (band) albums
Metal Blade Records compilation albums